Köprücü is a village in the Kemalpaşa District, Artvin Province, Turkey. Its population is 729 (2021).

References

Villages in Kemalpaşa District
Laz settlements in Turkey